This is a list of electoral district results for the 1944 New South Wales state election.

Results by electoral district

Albury

Annandale 

 Preferences were not distributed.

Armidale

Ashburnham

Ashfield

Auburn 

 Jack Lang was the sitting MP for Auburn, who won the previous election as a Labor candidate.

Balmain 

 Preferences were not distributed.

Bankstown

Barwon

Bathurst

Blacktown 

 Preferences were not distributed.

Bondi

Botany

Bulli 

|- style="background-color:#E9E9E9"
! colspan="6" style="text-align:left;" |After distribution of preferences

 Preferences were not distributed to completion.

Burwood 

 Gordon Jackett had been elected at the previous election as an Independent UAP candidate, and held the seat as a Democratic member.

Byron

Canterbury

Casino

Castlereagh

Cessnock

Clarence

Cobar

Concord 

|- style="background-color:#E9E9E9"
! colspan="6" style="text-align:left;" |After distribution of preferences

 Preferences were not distributed to completion.

Coogee

Cook's River

Corowa

Croydon

Drummoyne

Dubbo 

 Preferences were not distributed.
 Clarrie Robertson had won the seat for Labor at the 1942 Dubbo by-election, and retained it at this election.

Dulwich Hill

Georges River

Gloucester

Gordon

Goulburn

Granville

Hamilton

Hartley

Hawkesbury 

 Preferences were not distributed.

Hornsby

Hurstville

Illawarra 

 Preferences were not distributed.

King

Kogarah 

 Preferences were not distributed.

Kurri Kurri

Lachlan 

 John Chanter had won the seat for Labor at the 1943 Lachlan by-election, and retained it at this election.

Lakemba 

|- style="background-color:#E9E9E9"
! colspan="6" style="text-align:left;" |After distribution of preferences

 Preferences were not distributed to completion.

Lane Cove

Leichhardt 

 Preferences were not distributed.

Lismore

Liverpool Plains

Maitland

Manly 

 Alfred Reid had been elected at the previous election as a UAP member, however he was not pre-selected by the Democratic Party and held the seat as an Independent Democratic candidate.

Marrickville

Monaro

Mosman 

 Preferences were not distributed.

Mudgee 

 Preferences were not distributed.

Murray

Murrumbidgee 

 Ambrose Enticknap was the sitting MP for Murrumbidgee, who won the previous election as an Independent Labor candidate.

Namoi

Nepean 

 Joseph Jackson was the sitting MP for Nepean, who won the previous election as a United Australia candidate.

Neutral Bay 

 Preferences were not distributed.

Newcastle

Newtown

North Sydney

Orange

Oxley

Paddington

Parramatta

Phillip

Raleigh

Randwick 

 Preferences were not distributed.

Redfern

Rockdale 

 Preferences were not distributed.

Ryde

South Coast 

 Preferences were not distributed.

Sturt

Tamworth

Temora 

 Preferences were not distributed.

Tenterfield

Upper Hunter

Vaucluse

Wagga Wagga

Waratah 

 Preferences were not distributed.

Waverley

Willoughby

Wollondilly

Wollongong-Kembla

Woollahra 

 Preferences were not distributed.

Yass

Young

See also 
 Candidates of the 1944 New South Wales state election
 Members of the New South Wales Legislative Assembly, 1944–1947

Notes

References 

1944